Komal Kumar (born 4 July 1973), known mononymously as Komal, is an Indian actor and film producer known for his work in Kannada cinema. He made his acting debut with Super Nan Maga in 1992. Since his debut, Komal has acted in over 100 films, initially in comedic roles as a supporting actor before playing lead roles. He is the younger brother of actor Jaggesh, with whom he has frequently collaborated professionally.

Komal has won Karnataka State Film Award for Best Supporting Actor for his role as a supporting actor in the film Thavarige Baa Thangi in 2003. He has also won the South Filmfare Award for his performance in Neenello Naanalle in 2006.

Early life and family 
Komal was born into a well-to-do family of industrialists. He completed his studies in Ooty and was interested in taking up the civil service examinations before he lost interest in academics. He subsequently wanted to pursue a course in cinematography at the Film and Television Institute in Pune, but was unable to do so "owing to my academic background in arts." He then took to acting "doing small roles". His brother, Jaggesh, is an established actor in Kannada cinema. Komal's nephews Gururaj and Yethiraj are also actors. His wife Anasooya Komal Kumar is a producer who has produced the film Kal Manja. The couple released the film under their home banner Soundarya Lahari Combines.

Career 
Komal made his film debut playing a supporting role in his brother's 1992 film Super Nan Maga. In Military Mava (1993), he was cast in a lead role. In an interview to Deccan Herald in 2003, he recalled, "Unfortunately, the [latter] film flopped miserably and I lost interest in acting. But my brother kept encouraging me to take up more acting assignments. He would always advice me not to give up." He added, "My role of a villain in Soma (1996) against my brother Jaggesh and Subhashri, who is Malashri's sister, was appreciated so much by Malashri that she cast me for her brother's role in her next movie Lady Commissioner." After a string of other films that he acted in failed to do well or failed to fetch him recognition, it was in Thavarige Baa Thangi (2002) that he received appreciation for his performance. He was subsequently cast in Katthegalu Saar Katthegalu (2003).

Komal played a lead role in Mr. Garagasa (2008). However he got a break as a lead actor in the 2009 released Chamkaisi Chindi Udaysi produced by his brother-in-law and his wife. Since then he acted as a solo hero in films such as Maryade Ramanna and Kal Manja.

His 2012 film Govindaya Namaha has been declared a blockbuster catapulting him to the stardom status. The song "Pyarge Aagbittaite" featuring Parul Yadav and himself went viral on the internet. After a string of commercial failures, Komal starred in the horror–comedy Namo Bhootatma, a performance that was received well by critics. Shyam Prasad S. of Bangalore Mirror felt that "Komal does his job well" and that "[t]here are no histrionics with everything cut to the point." Prior to the film's release, Komal had stated that he would quit Kannada films if it failed commercially. After being typecast as an actor who could only play comedic roles, Komal starred in the cop film Kempegowda 2 (2019), the eponymous role that he shed  to play.

Partial filmography 
All films are in Kannada, unless otherwise noted.

References

External links 
 
 Komal Kumar Filmography
 Komal Interview

Kannada people
Indian male film actors
Male actors in Kannada cinema
Living people
Male actors from Karnataka
People from Tumkur district
Indian male comedians
21st-century Indian male actors
1973 births